Donald Cameron Sr. (16 September 1869 – 29 January 1936) was a farmer, engineer and a provincial politician from Alberta, Canada. He served as a member of the Legislative Assembly of Alberta from 1921 to 1935 sitting with the United Farmers caucus in government.

Early life
Donald Cameron was born in Scotland. He became an engineer and lived in Hong Kong for a time. He moved back to England and had a son Donald Cameron Jr. on 6 March 1901. He moved to Elnora, Alberta in 1906 and began farming.

Political career
Cameron ran for a seat to the Alberta Legislature in the 1921 Alberta general election as a United Farmers candidate in the electoral district of Innisfail. He defeated Liberal incumbent Daniel Morkeberg with a landslide majority to pick up the seat for his party.

Cameron ran for a second term in the 1926 Alberta general election. He faced a hotly contested three way race facing Morkeburg for the second time. Cameron hung on to win the election with second choice vote preferences.

Morkeburg and Cameron would face each other one last time in the 1930 Alberta general election. The three way race was very close with Cameron edging Morkeburg out on second preference votes.

Morkeburg did not run for a fourth term in office and retired at dissolution of the assembly in 1935.

References

External links
Legislative Assembly of Alberta Members Listing

United Farmers of Alberta MLAs
1936 deaths
1869 births